Beyond the Valley of the Murderdolls is the debut studio album by American horror punk supergroup Murderdolls. It was released in 2002 by Roadrunner Records. The album reached number 40 on the UK Albums Chart, and sold 100,000 copies in the U.S.

The original pressing of the album featured 15 tracks, with a later re-release containing six additional bonus tracks.

Previously recorded versions
Most of the songs on the album came from Wednesday 13's previous bands Maniac Spider Trash and Frankenstein Drag Queens From Planet 13 or Joey Jordison's previous band The Rejects.

Wednesday 13 recorded the following song with Maniac Spider Trash:
Mother Fucker (Motherfucker I Don't Care)

Wednesday 13 recorded the following songs previously with Frankenstein Drag Queens From Planet 13:
Twist My Sister
Let's Go To War - Recorded before Refuse To Rot by The Rejects
Die My Bride
197666
Kill Miss America
Hooray For Horrorwood (Dead In Hollywood)
Welcome To The Strange
I Love to Say Fuck

Joey Jordison recorded the following songs previously with the band The Rejects:
I take Drugz (I Take Drugs)
Let'z Fuck (Let's Fuck)
People Hate Me
Crash Crash
Everybody's Everything (B-Movie Scream Queen)
Refuse To Rot (Let's Go To War)
I Fell In Love With A Zombie (She Was A Teenage Zombie)
Shez Gonna Go (Dressed To Depress)

Track listing

Personnel
Wednesday 13 – lead vocals, bass guitar, guitars, programming
Joey Jordison – lead and rhythm guitar, bass, drums, percussion, keyboard, piano, backing vocals
Tripp Eisen – lead guitar, backing vocals

Charts

References

2002 debut albums
Murderdolls albums
Roadrunner Records albums